Meghowal Doaba village, Doaba, Punjab is located near Mahilpur, Hoshiarpur, Punjab, India. The village has an elementary school, Sarkari Primary School, and a government-run regional high school. 3 kilometers away from Totumazara to east side.Pind Road, Meghowal, Punjab 146109, India  Location

Gurudoare Sant Baba Bhai Ajeet Singh Ji situated in center of village. Good Map

References

Villages in Hoshiarpur district